Fear Is the Key is a 1972 British action thriller film directed by Michael Tuchner and based on the 1961 novel of the same title by Alistair MacLean. It stars Barry Newman and Suzy Kendall, with supporting roles by John Vernon, Dolph Sweet, and Ben Kingsley in his feature film debut. The film features a soundtrack by Roy Budd.

Plot
John Talbot is talking on radio to a woman and a man who is flying a plane. He hears them being machine gunned to death by another plane.

Some time later, Talbot appears in a small town in Louisiana, where he starts a fight with some local police. He is arrested and faces trial, where it is revealed he is wanted for killing a policeman and robbing a bank. Talbot escapes from the courtroom, shooting another policeman and kidnapping a woman, Sarah Ruthven.

A car chase ensues. Talbot and Sarah meet up with a mysterious man, Jablonsky, who reveals that Sarah is the daughter of an oil millionaire.

Jablonsky turns Talbot and Sarah over to Sarah's father. A man working for him, Vyland, hires Talbot for an unspecified task. Jablonsky is retained to guard Talbot. It is then revealed that Jablonsky and Talbot know each other and have arranged the whole scenario for an unspecified reason.

Late at night, Talbot sneaks out of the house and travels to an oil platform to search for something. When he returns he sees Vyland's henchmen burying something – it is Jablonsky's body.

Talbot then sneaks into Sarah's room and makes a confession: all the events up until the present time are part of a scheme. The brawl in the town was to get Talbot into court. The shootout in court was faked; Talbot shot the policeman with blanks. Sarah was invited there deliberately so she could be kidnapped. Everything was set up to get Talbot and Jablonsky into the house. Talbot says her father used his money for a stake in a salvage operation but didn't know about Vyland, and that Sarah and her father are in danger, especially after the death of Jablonsky. Talbot asks Sarah for her help, although he won't say what his plan is or what is going on.

Talbot is hired to operate a submersible for an unspecified project. He goes to an oil platform with Sarah, Ruthven, Vyland, Royale and Larry. Talbot deliberately delays the launch of the submersible.

Larry begins to suspect Talbot and pulls a gun on him but falls off the platform and dies. With Sarah's help, Talbot then kills another of Vyland's men. He calls for help from the mainland but the authorities cannot fly to the platform because of the storm. He is forced to enter the submersible with Vyland and Royale.

The submersible approaches the wreck of a Douglas DC-3. Vyland admits to Talbot he is looking for cargo. Talbot says he knows what the cargo is – over $80 million in uncut diamonds. Talbot then switches off the oxygen and tells Vyland and Royale they will die in six minutes.

Talbot says the diamonds were a payment from the Colombian government to buy arms during a revolution. They hired a plane from a small airline, Talbot's, but it was shot down by people who knew what was on the flight. Talbot says the plane contained his brother, his wife and his 3-year-old son. He has planned his revenge over three years.

Talbot tells Vyland and Royale he is willing to die on the ocean floor beside his family. He asks who ordered the destruction of the plane. Vyland confesses it was him, which is heard by Talbot's associates on the oil platform via microphone. Royale shoots Vyland dead. He then confesses to killing Jablonsky. Talbot turns on the oxygen and returns to the surface.

Cast
 Barry Newman as John Talbot 
 Suzy Kendall as Sarah Ruthven 
 John Vernon as Vyland 
 Dolph Sweet as Jablonsky 
 Ben Kingsley as Royale 
 Ray McAnally as Ruthven 
 Peter Marinker as Larry 
 Elliott Sullivan as Judge Mollison 
 Roland Brand as Deputy 
 Tony Anholt as FBI Agent
 John Alderson as Tanner (uncredited) 
 James Berwick as (uncredited) 
 Hal Galili as Cibatti (uncredited) 
 Ernie Heldman as Bartender (uncredited)

Production
The novel was published in 1961. Film rights were bought by producer Elliott Kastner who had filmed a number of MacLean novels. MacLean wrote the scripts for the two earlier Kastner films, Where Eagles Dare and Where Eight Bells Toll but was too busy to do the script for Fear is the Key so the job went to Robert Carrington.

The car chase was choreographed by Carey Loftin, who had worked on Vanishing Point which also starred Barry Newman. Newman said he enjoyed making Fear is the Key. "I thought the character that I played was a lovely character for the kind of film it was, an Alistair MacLean story."

Reception
The film was a box office disappointment in the US but performed better in Europe. It was one of the most popular movies of 1973 at the British box office.

References

External links

Review of film in The New York Times
Film review at Alistair Maclean.com
Review of movie at Black Hole Review

1972 films
1970s crime thriller films
British chase films
British crime thriller films
Films about kidnapping
Films about murder
British films about revenge
Films based on British novels
Films based on works by Alistair MacLean
Films set in Louisiana
Films scored by Roy Budd
Treasure hunt films
Underwater action films
EMI Films films
1970s English-language films
1970s British films